The 1991 Canoe Slalom World Cup was a series of five races in 4 canoeing and kayaking categories organized by the International Canoe Federation (ICF). It was the 4th edition. The series consisted of 4 regular world cup races and the world cup final.

Calendar

Final standings 

The winner of each world cup race was awarded 25 points. The points scale reached down to 1 point for 15th place. Only the best three results of each athlete counted for the final world cup standings. If two or more athletes or boats were equal on points, the ranking was determined by their positions in the world cup final.

Results

World Cup Race 1 

The first world cup race of the season took place in Mezzana from 29 to 30 June.

World Cup Race 2 

The second world cup race of the season took place at the Augsburg Eiskanal from 6 to 7 July.

World Cup Race 3 

The third world cup race of the season took place in Reals from 10 to 11 July.

World Cup Race 4 

The fourth world cup race of the season took place at the Minden Wild Water Preserve in Ontario from 24 to 25 August.

World Cup Final 

The final world cup race of the season took place in Wausau, Wisconsin from 31 August to 1 September.

References

External links 
 International Canoe Federation

Canoe Slalom World Cup
1991 in canoeing